Sir Robert Gillman Allen Jackson,  (8 November 1911 – 12 January 1991) was an Australian naval officer, public servant and United Nations administrator who specialised in technical and logistical assistance to the developing world.

Early life
Jackson was born Wilbur Kenneth Jackson in Melbourne, Victoria, on 8 November 1911. He was educated at Cheltenham High School and Mentone Grammar School, which his father Archibald Jackson had helped found, but his father's death meant he did not go to university and started his career in the Royal Australian Navy at 18.

Career
Jackson was seconded to the Royal Navy in 1938 and proved his ability in his plans for defending Malta during the Second World War, for which he was appointed an Officer of the Order of the British Empire. In 1941, he was appointed principal adviser to Oliver Lyttleton, War Cabinet minister in Cairo, and his work with the Middle East Supply Centre encouraging local food production across many countries fostered his diplomatic and administrative skills.

After the war, Jackson was responsible for the United Nations Relief and Rehabilitation Administration (UNRRA) projects in Europe, parts of Africa and the Far East, "the biggest UN relief operation ever". Next he was assistant to Trygve Lie, first secretary-general of the UN, with whom he had an awkward working relationship, and then returned to the United Kingdom to work at the Treasury before moving to the Australian Ministry of National Development.

Jackson came to specialise in multiple purpose river development schemes, and his obituary in The Times said "he was associated with virtually all major undertakings of this kind in the developing world". While working on the Volta project in Ghana from 1953 to 1960, he got to know Kwame Nkrumah. His time in Ghana led to the awards of Knight Bachelor in 1956, and Knight Commander of the Royal Victorian Order in 1962.

From the 1950s onward, he advised the governments of India and Pakistan, and in 1962 he went to the UN as consultant to Paul Hoffman of the United Nations Development Programme (UNDP), advising on technical, logistical and pre-investment aid to developing countries. By 1971, he had helped with UNDP projects in 60 countries.

The "Jackson Report" or "Capacity Study" on UN reform was published in 1969, urging that UN projects should be harmonised with a country's own development plan, and provoking some controversy. Margaret Anstee, another UN administrator, collaborated with him on this report. They became close personally as well as professionally, and their relationship continued until Jackson's death on 12 January 1991.

Jackson's last major operations were co-ordinating relief for Bangladesh between 1972 and 1975, and assistance for Kampuchea and Kampuchean refugees in Thailand between 1979 and 1984. He was made a Companion of the Order of Australia in 1986.

Jackson has been called a "master of logistics" with his work in Malta, UNRRA, and Bangladesh given particular praise.

Personal life
Jackson married Barbara Ward in 1950, after his first marriage had ended. They had a son in 1956, but were legally separated in the early 1970s.

Jackson died in London on 12 January 1991 of a stroke.

References

Further reading
Harlan Cleveland, 'Introduction: History of an Idea 1959.’ In The Case for an International Development Authority, by Robert G. A. Jackson, edited by Harlan Cleveland, 5–18. Syracuse, NY: Syracuse University Press, 1959
James Gibson, Jacko, Where Are You Now? A life of Robert Jackson: Master of humanitarian relief, the man who saved Malta  (Parsons, London 2006)   
Robert G. A. Jackson, The Case for an International Development Authority, Syracuse, NY: Syracuse University Press, 1959
Robert G.A. Jackson, A Study of the Capacity of the United Nations Development System, 2 vols. (Geneva 1969)
Eli Karetny and Thomas G. Weiss. ‘UNRRA’s Operational Genius and Institutional Design.’ Wartime Origins and the Future United Nations, edited by Dan Plesch and Thomas G. Weiss, 99–120. London: Routledge, 2015
Chad J. Mitcham, ‘Australia and Development Cooperation at the United Nations: Towards Poverty Reduction.’ In Australia and the United Nations, edited by James Cotton and David Lee, 191–221. Canberra: Department of Foreign Affairs and Trade and Sydney: Longueville Books, 2013
Chad J. Mitcham, 'Jackson, Sir Robert Gillman (1911–1991)', Australian Dictionary of Biography, National Centre of Biography, Australian National University, http://adb.anu.edu.au/biography/jackson-sir-robert-gillman-20715/text31511, published online 2016. Retrieved 10 November 2016.
Alan R. Raucher, Paul G. Hoffman: Architect of Foreign Aid (Kentucky 1985)
Brian Urquhart, A Life in Peace and War  (London 1987)

External links
Truman Library oral history – memories of Jackson

1911 births
1991 deaths
Companions of the Order of Australia
Australian Knights Commander of the Royal Victorian Order
Australian Companions of the Order of St Michael and St George
Australian Officers of the Order of the British Empire
Commanders of the Order of the White Lion
Public servants from Melbourne
Australian officials of the United Nations
People educated at Mentone Grammar School
Spouses of life peers
Military personnel from Melbourne